Borja Blanco Gil (born 16 November 1984), commonly known as Borja, is a Spanish futsal player who plays for Marca Futsal as an Ala.

Honours
1 UEFA Futsal Championship (2007, 2010)
1 runner FIFA World Cup (2008)
1 Supercopa de España (2009)
1 Copa de España (2009)
1 Copa Intercontinental (2011)
1 UEFA Futsal Cup (2009)
1 U-21 UEFA Futsal Championship (2005)
1 best Winger-Forward of the LNFS (07/08)
1 player revelation LNFS (05/06)
MVP of the Copa de España (Cuenca 2008)

References

External links
LNFS profile
RFEF profile
UEFA profile

1984 births
Living people
Spanish men's futsal players
Inter FS players
Caja Segovia FS players
People from Móstoles
Sportspeople from the Community of Madrid